The Great Wall Pegasus is a full-size SUV produced by Great Wall Motors.

Overview

The Great Wall Pegasus is powered by the Toyota-sourced GW491QE inline-4 2.2 liter engine. As the SUV version of the Great Wall SoCool and the short wheelbase version of the Great Wall Sing, the body design of the Great Wall Pegasus was based on the SWB 5-door Isuzu MU produced under license sharing a redesigned front end with the Great Wall SoCool.

References

External links

Official website

Pegasus
Sport utility vehicles
Cars of China
2000s cars
2010s cars